A Night at the Ritz is a 1935 American comedy film directed by William C. McGann and starring William Gargan, Patricia Ellis and Allen Jenkins. The art direction was by Esdras Hartley. The film is of interest because the storyline, involving a con artist trying to profit off an impersonation, somewhat anticipates the more-famous Nothing Sacred two years later.

Plot

Leopold Jaynos dreams of becoming a famous chef, despite the fact that he can't cook a whit. Fast-talking press agent Duke Regan, who's dating his sister Marcia, comes up with a scheme: He goes to the Ritz Hotel and tells manager Vincent that a world-famous Hungarian chef is coming to visit and to roll out the red carpet for him and his entourage (meaning Regan and sidekick Gyp). Vincent happily agrees, but with his own job on the line, begs Regan to get Leopold to become the new chef for the hotel. Problem: Regan doesn't know that Leopold can't really cook—those delicious meals he had at the Jaynos home were actually cooked by their mother.

Cast
 William Gargan as Duke Regan 
 Patricia Ellis as Marcia Jaynos  
 Allen Jenkins as Gyp Beagle  
 Dorothy Tree as Kiki Lorraine  
 Erik Rhodes as Leopold Jaynos  
 Berton Churchill as Stephen Vincent  
 Gordon Westcott as Joe Scurvin  
 Bodil Rosing as Mama Jaynos  
 Arthur Hoyt as Mr. Hassler  
 Paul Porcasi as Henri  
 William B. Davidson as Connolly, an Editor 
 Mary Treen as Isabelle, Hassler's Secretary  
 Mary Russell as Miss Barry, Vincent's Secretary

References

Bibliography
 Christine Gledhill. Stardom: Industry of Desire. Psychology Press, 1991.

External links
 

1935 films
1935 comedy films
American comedy films
Films directed by William C. McGann
Warner Bros. films
American black-and-white films
1930s English-language films
1930s American films